The Rat Islands are a group of American volcanic islands in the Aleutian Islands in southwestern Alaska, between Buldir Island and the Near Islands group to its west, and Amchitka Pass and the Andreanof Islands group to its east. The largest islands in the group are, from west to east, Kiska, Little Kiska, Segula, Hawadax or Kryssei, Khvostof, Davidof, Little Sitkin, Amchitka, and Semisopochnoi. The total land area of the Rat Islands is 360.849 sq mi (934.594 km2). None of the islands are inhabited.

The name Rat Islands is the English translation of the name given to the islands by Captain Fyodor Petrovich Litke in 1827 when he visited the Aleutian Islands on a voyage around the world. The islands are named so because rats were accidentally introduced to Rat Island in about 1780. , after a government-funded eradication program, Rat Island is believed to be rat-free; it was renamed Hawadax Island in 2012. However, a post-operation assessment found that many of the island's local bird populations were negatively impacted—there was a far higher-than-expected nontarget mortality. An internal U.S. Fish and Wildlife Service Office of Law Enforcement investigation revealed that several laws may have been violated.

The Rat Islands are earthquake-prone as they are located on the boundary of the Pacific and North American tectonic plates. The 1965 Rat Islands earthquake was one of the largest in recorded history with a magnitude of 8.7.

References

Further reading

External links
Rat Islands: Blocks 1138 thru 1145, Census Tract 1, Aleutians West Census Area, Alaska United States Census Bureau

 
Islands of Aleutians West Census Area, Alaska
Volcanic groups
Islands of the Aleutian Islands
Islands of Alaska
Islands of Unorganized Borough, Alaska